Keith Carlock (born November 29, 1971) is an American musician who has played drums with Toto, Wayne Krantz, Steely Dan, James Taylor, Donald Fagen, Walter Becker, Tal Wilkenfeld, John Mayer, Sting, and Chris Botti. In Modern Drummer's 2009 Readers Poll, he was voted best Pop, Fusion, and All-Around drummer. He is a member of the Mississippi Musicians Hall of Fame.

Carlock was born in Clinton, Mississippi, and attended North Texas State University.

In October 2009, he released an instructional DVD called The Big Picture: Phrasing, Improvisation, Style, and Technique.

Carlock met and began playing with Steely Dan in the late 1990s, starring on their album Two Against Nature released in 2000 and then Everything Must Go released in 2003. Carlock has been touring with them since 2003, continuing to do so despite Walter Becker's death in 2017. In January 2014, Carlock joined Toto, replacing longtime drummer Simon Phillips. He played on every track of the album Toto XIV and toured with them in April–May 2014.

Carlock uses Gretsch drums, Evans Drumheads, Zildjian cymbals, and Vic Firth drumsticks.

External links
Keith Carlock Interview NAMM Oral History Library (2008)

References

1971 births
Living people
People from Clinton, Mississippi
20th-century American drummers
American male drummers
21st-century American drummers
Toto (band) members
University of North Texas alumni